CLI may refer to:

Computing
 Call Level Interface, an SQL database management API
 Command-line interface, of a computer program
 Command-line interpreter or command language interpreter; see List of command-line interpreters
 CLI (x86 instruction)
 ISO Common Language Infrastructure for multi-platform code (.Net)

Organisations
 Caribbean Law Institute
 Clì Gàidhlig, an organisation supporting learners of Scottish Gaelic
 Committee for the Liberation of Iraq
 Corps Léger d'Intervention

Other
 151 (number), in Roman numerals
 Canada Land Inventory
 Cebu Landmasters, Philippine stock exchange code CLI
 Critical limb ischemia
 Telephone Caller Line Identification (Caller ID)